The Abia State Ministry of Environment is an Abia State Government ministry responsible for developing and implementing policies, programs and legislation in order to protect and conserve the environment of Abia State for sustainable development.

See also
Abia State Government

References

Environment of Nigeria
Government ministries of Abia State
Abia